

Administrative and municipal divisions

References

Geography of Nizhny Novgorod Oblast
Nizhny Novgorod Oblast